The 1976 Rothmans International Series was an Australian motor racing competition open to single seater racing cars complying with Australian Formula 1. The series, which was the first Rothmans International Series, was won by Vern Schuppan, driving a Lola T332 Chevrolet.

Schedule
The 1976 Rothmans International Series was contested over four rounds with one race per round.

The final round was postponed for one week due to heavy rain and flooding and the re-scheduled race was cancelled after qualifying due to further rain.

Points system
Series points were awarded on a 9-6-4-3-2-1 basis for the first six places at each round.

Series results

References

Further reading
 There's hope for the future, Australian Motor Racing Action 1976, pages 12 to 17

Rothmans International Series
Rothmans
Formula 5000